The Kaproni Bulgarski KB-11 Fazan was a 1940s Bulgarian army liaison and utility monoplane built by Kaproni Bulgarski, a subsidiary of the Italian aviation conglomerate Società Italiana Caproni.

Development and design
The prototype Fazan flew in 1941 as a shoulder-wing monoplane powered by a  Alfa Romeo 126 R.C.34 radial engine. It had a fixed conventional landing gear with a tailwheel. Flight testing of the prototype showed that the aircraft was unstable and was nose-heavy in level flight, and was considered unsafe during forced-landings. By analogy with the Hunchback of Notre-Dame, the prototype gaining the unflattering nickname "Quasimodo".

The second prototype was redesigned with a high-wing, a revised undercarriage and new cockpit glazing, while retaining the engine and three-bladed fixed-pitch propeller of the first prototype. The revised aircraft successfully passed its flight trials, and a small batch of six similar aircraft, designated KB-11-I, followed. While this batch was being built, a further-revised version was produced, the KB-11-II. This took advantage of the availability of large quantities of PZL-license built Bristol Pegasus engines that had been captured by the Germans during the Invasion of Poland, with a Pegasus XXI driving a two-bladed wooden propeller replacing the Alfa-Romeo, while the fuselage glazing was changed again. This revised aircraft was renamed Fazan, and was followed by 43 production aircraft.

Operational history
The KB-11 was used to replace Letov Š-328s and PZL.43 in the short-range reconnaissance squadrons of the Bulgarian Air Force, equipping four squadrons. Fazans were used in joint Bulgarian-German-Italian operations against Tito's Partisans in Serbia from 1943.  Following Bulgaria's armistice with the Soviet Union and declaration of war against Germany in September 1944, the Bulgarian Air Force was used in support of Bulgarian Army forces in Serbia and Macedonia who were fighting against their former allies. KB-11 equipped units saw only limited use in this offensive, possibly because of the aircraft's similarity to the German Henschel Hs 126.

In 1947, 30 KB-11s were transferred to Yugoslavia as part of war reparations following the Paris Peace Treaties. They were used as trainers, liaison aircraft and target tugs. The wooden wings were replaced by metal wings by Ikarus, allowing the KB-11 to continue in service in Yugoslavia until 1958.

Operators

Bulgarian Air Force

SFR Yugoslav Air Force

Specifications

See also

References

Notes

Bibliography

1940s Bulgarian military utility aircraft
Single-engined tractor aircraft
High-wing aircraft
Aircraft first flown in 1941